Olga Sokolova may refer to:
Olga Sokolova (cyclist), Russian cyclist
Olga Sokolova (athlete), USSR Hammer thrower, see 1990 Hammer Throw Year Ranking
Olga Sokolova (swimmer), Russian multiple Paralympic medalist, represented Russia at the 2012 Summer Paralympics